Kenneath Bromwich (born 22 September 1991) is a New Zealand professional rugby league footballer who plays as a  forward for the Dolphins in the National Rugby League (NRL), and New Zealand at international level.

He previously played for the Melbourne Storm in the National Rugby League and New Zealand Māori at representative level. He is a dual NRL premiership winning player of 2017 and 2020.

Early life
Bromwich was born in Auckland, New Zealand. He moved to Melbourne, Australia, and was educated at Hallam Secondary College.

His older brother, Jesse Bromwich, also plays for New Zealand and the Melbourne Storm.

Originally a Manurewa Marlins junior in New Zealand, Kenny was signed to play for Melbourne Storm SG Ball team.

Bromwich then graduated onto play for the Melbourne Storm Toyota Cup (Under-20s) team in 2009, 2010 and 2011. He captained the team in 2011 and also was chosen in the 2011 Toyota Cup team of the year. 

He has also made appearances  for the Easts Tigers and Sunshine Coast Falcons in the Queensland Cup.

Playing career

2013
Round 5 of the 2013 NRL season Bromwich made his NRL debut for Melbourne against the Wests Tigers. He went on to play 9 games in his debut season. 

Bromwich also played in the Queensland Cup Grandfinal.

2014
Started the year well and went to play 18 games with Melbourne. Bromwich played in another Queensland Cup Grandfinal.

2015
Bromwich started the first 9 rounds in the Queensland Cup with the Sunshine Coast Falcons and went on to play in the Queensland Residents team against the New South Wales Residents at Langlands Park. 

He finished the year in the Melbourne Storm first grade team with 18 games.

2016

In May 2016, Bromwich made his international debut for New Zealand Kiwis in the 2016 Anzac Test. 

He played in every single game for the Melbourne Storm this year, as well as the loss in the 2016 NRL Grand Final against the Cronulla-Sutherland Sharks.

2017

2017 was a good year for Bromwich, he played in 26 of the 27 games played this season only to miss the Anzac clash against the New Zealand Warriors due to the birth of his first child. He played in the 2017 NRL Grand Final victory.

He later went on to represent New Zealand in the 2017 Anzac Test and in the 2017 Rugby League World Cup.

2018
He was also part of the Melbourne Storm team that played in the 2018 World Club Challenge and 2018 NRL Grand Final loss against the Sydney Roosters.

2019
He played 27 games for Melbourne in the 2019 NRL season as the club finished as runaway Minor Premiers, however the club fell short of another grand final after capitulating against the Sydney Roosters in the preliminary final.

2020
He played 21 games for Melbourne in the 2020 NRL season including the club's 2020 NRL Grand Final victory over Penrith.

2021
Bromwich played a total of 21 games for Melbourne in the 2021 NRL season as the club won 19 matches in a row and claimed the Minor Premiership.  He played in two finals matches including the preliminary final where Melbourne suffered a shock 10-6 loss against eventual premiers Penrith.

2022
On 3 February 2022, the Dolphins confirmed via Twitter that Bromwich had signed a three year deal to join them, starting 2023.

In October he was named in the New Zealand squad for the 2021 Rugby League World Cup.

References

External links
Melbourne Storm profile
Prosportplayer.co.nz
Melbournestrom.com.au
2017 RLWC profile

1991 births
Living people
Eastern Suburbs Tigers players
New Zealand rugby league players
New Zealand Māori rugby league team players
New Zealand national rugby league team players
Melbourne Storm players
Junior Kiwis players
Manurewa Marlins players
Rugby league props
Sunshine Coast Falcons players
Rugby league second-rows
Rugby league locks
Rugby league players from Auckland
New Zealand expatriates in Australia